The Dutch Eredivisie in the 1990–91 season was contested by 18 teams. PSV won the championship.

League standings

Results

Promotion/relegation
The number 16 of the Eredivisie would play against relegation against the runners-up of the promotion/relegation play-offs of the Eerste Divisie. The Eerste Divisie league champions and winner of the play-offs would replace the numbers 17 and 18 of this league directly.

SVV: remain in Eredivisie and merge with Dordrecht '90 
NAC: remain in Eerste Divisie

See also
 1990–91 Eerste Divisie
 1990–91 KNVB Cup

References

 Eredivisie official website - info on all seasons 
 RSSSF

Eredivisie seasons
Netherlands
1990–91 in Dutch football